Pternidora koghisiana is a species of moth of the family Tortricidae. It is found in New Caledonia in the southwest Pacific Ocean.

The wingspan is about 10 mm. The ground colour of the forewings is pale brownish, with darker markings. The hindwings are brown.

Etymology
The species name refers to Mount Koghis, the type locality.

References

Moths described in 2013
Enarmoniini